The 1985 Boston Red Sox season was the 85th season in the franchise's Major League Baseball history. The Red Sox finished fifth in the American League East with a record of 81 wins and 81 losses,  games behind the Toronto Blue Jays.

Offseason
January 14, 1985: Pitcher Bruce Kison was signed as a free agent by the Red Sox.

Regular season

The Red Sox also had one game end in a tie; on July 31, a home game against the Chicago White Sox was ended in the 7th inning due to rain, with the score tied, 1–1. It was the first tie game for the Red Sox since June 8, 1961. The game was replayed the following day as part of a doubleheader. MLB games that end in a tie are not included in league standings, although individual player statistics (e.g. hits, errors, innings pitched) are counted.

Season standings

Record vs. opponents

Notable transactions
The Red Sox drafted pitcher Dan Gabriele in the first round (21st overall) of the 1985 Major League Baseball draft. Gabriele went on to pitch in Boston's farm system through 1989, reaching the Double-A level.

Opening Day lineup

Source:

Roster

Statistical leaders 

Source:

Batting 

Source:

Pitching 

Source:

Awards and honors
Awards
 Dwight Evans – Gold Glove Award (OF)

Accomplishments
 Wade Boggs, American League Batting Champion, .368
 Wade Boggs, American League Leader, Hits (240)
 Bill Buckner, MLB record, Most Assists in a Season by a First Baseman (184)
Surpassed by Albert Pujols in 2009

All-Star Game
 Wade Boggs, reserve 3B
 Rich Gedman, reserve C
 Jim Rice, starting LF

Farm system 

The Greensboro Hornets replaced the Winston-Salem Spirits as a Class A affiliate.

Source:

References

External links
1985 Boston Red Sox team page at Baseball Reference
1985 Boston Red Sox season at baseball-almanac.com

Boston Red Sox seasons
Boston Red Sox
Boston Red Sox
Red Sox